Sekka may refer to:

El Sekka El Hadid SC,  an Egyptian football club based in Cairo, Egypt
Sekka Zusetsu, a figure collection by Doi Toshitsura
Johnny Sekka (1934–2006), Senegalese-born Gambian actor
Kamisaka Sekka (1866-1942), Japanese artist

See also
 
 Seka (actress)
 Sekkan (摂関)